Dieter Honecker (23 October 1930 – 29 July 2012) was a German footballer who played for SV Saar 05 Saarbrücken and the Saarland national team as a forward.

References

1930 births
2012 deaths
German footballers
Saar footballers
Saarland international footballers
SV Saar 05 Saarbrücken players
Association football forwards